Swimming at the 1976 Summer Paralympics consisted of 146 events.

Medal summary

Medal table

Participating nations

Men's events

Women's events

References 

 

1976 Summer Paralympics events
1976
Paralympics